Millbrook Winery is an Australian winery at Jarrahdale, in the Perth Hills wine region of Western Australia.  The winery was established in 1996 on the site of Chestnut Farm, a former orchard.  Its founders and owners are Peter and Lee Fogarty, who also own several other wineries.

See also

 Australian wine
 List of wineries in Western Australia
 Western Australian wine

References

Notes

Bibliography

External links
Millbrook Winery – official site

Companies established in 1996
Wineries in Western Australia
1996 establishments in Australia